Occupying a peninsula between the Sakonnet River and Rhode Island Sound, the  Sachuest Point National Wildlife Refuge is a very popular site for the over 65,000 annual visitors each year. It is located in the southeasternmost part of the Town of Middletown.

Sachuest Point National Wildlife Refuge is renowned for its fantastic saltwater fishing, and the presence of the largest winter population of harlequin ducks on the East Coast.

Once a horse racing area, then a Naval communications site, and now a National Wildlife Refuge, the area is steeped in history.

From salt marsh and beach strand habitats to upland shrub dominated lands, the refuge supports over 200 bird species, with such notable occasional visitors such as the peregrine falcon, northern harrier, and the snowy owl.

Sachuest Point, along with the four other National Wildlife Refuges in the State, is administered by the Rhode Island National Wildlife Refuge Complex, headquartered in Charlestown, Rhode Island.

Sachuest Point National Wildlife Refuge was closed following Hurricane Sandy due to damage from the storm. The refuge reopened on May 1, 2013. As of September 2013, the visitor center continues to operate with reduced hours due to the 2013 federal budget sequestration.

History
In 1970, a 70-acre donation from the Audubon Society of Rhode Island led to the establishment of Sachuest Point National Wildlife Refuge. Today, with land transfers from the Navy, the Refuge totals 242 acres that provide an important stopover and wintering area for migratory birds.

Sachuest Point was home to several military facilities in the 20th century. During the US participation in World War I, two 4.7-inch Armstrong guns were transferred from Fort Strong in Boston Harbor to provide some protection against German U-boats. "Sachuest Point" is misspelled in Army records for these guns as "Sauchet Point". The guns were removed in 1919; one was scrapped and one is a memorial in Ansonia, Connecticut. During World War II, the United States Navy established a communications station (NAVRADSTA Sachuest Point, part of NAVCOMMSTA Newport) and a rifle range. The remains of the rifle range still exist. The communications station was closed and demolished in 1973. At some time the United States Army Coast Artillery Corps erected fire control towers on Sachuest Point, probably in World War II to support Fort Church in Little Compton, which guarded the Sakonnet River and the eastern approaches to Narragansett Bay. These were probably abandoned after the war, and were demolished in the late 1970s.

See also
Norman Bird Sanctuary

References

External links
Refuge website
Friends of the National Wildlife Refuges of Rhode Island

National Wildlife Refuges in Rhode Island
Protected areas of Newport County, Rhode Island
Middletown, Rhode Island
Wetlands of Rhode Island
Landforms of Newport County, Rhode Island
Protected areas established in 1970
1970 establishments in Rhode Island